'Coronel Pringles is a department of San Luis Province, Argentina.

With an area of  it borders to the north with the departments of Ayacucho and San Martín, to the east with Chacabuco and General Pedernera, to the south with Pedernera, and to the west with Juan Martín de Pueyrredón, and Belgrano.

Municipalities 
 Carolina
 El Trapiche
 Estancia Grande
 Fraga
 La Bajada
 La Florida
 La Toma
 Riocito
 Saladillo

Villages 
 Arroyo Barranquita
 Balde de la Isla
 Baldecitos
 Cañada Honda
 Comandante Granville
 Cuatro Esquinas
 El Amago
 El Durazno
 El Manantial
 El Zapallar
 Eleodoro Lobos
 Juan Gez
 La Arenilla
 La Atalaya
 La Cumbre
 La Petra
 La Puerta
 Las Totoras
 Los Membrillos
 Los Pocitos
 Pampa del Tamboreo
 Paso de las Carretas
 Paso del Rey
 Puerta de Pancanta
 Río Grande
 San Gregorio
 Valle de Pancanta
 Virorco
El Guanaco

References

External links 
 Provincial website

Departments of San Luis Province